Lendu is a small town in Alor Gajah District in the Malaysian state of Malacca. Politically, Lendu is situated within the parliamentary constituency of Masjid Tanah and the state constituency of the same name.

Education
 Universiti Teknologi MARA Malacca Branch Alor Gajah Campus

Tourist attractions
 The Rubber Escape Resort Hotel

See also
 Alor Gajah District

References

Towns in Malacca